Nicholas (Nick) David Griffiths  (born 24 December 1951) is an Australian politician.
He was a member of the Western Australian Legislative Council representing the East Metropolitan Region.

Griffiths was born in Barry, Wales.  Elected to Parliament in the 1993 state election and subsequently re-elected in the 1996, 2001 and 2005 state elections, he is a member of the Labor Party. The Griffiths family emigrated to Western Australia in 1958.

Griffiths has held several ministerial positions since entering parliament including: Shadow Attorney-General (1996–1999), Minister of Racing and Gaming (2001–2005) and Minister of Housing and Works (2003–2005). Following the 2005 election, he was elected as President of the Western Australian Legislative Council, a post which he held until 21 May 2009.

Griffiths was awarded a Medal of the Order of Australia (OAM) in the 2018 Australia Day Honours, "For service to the people and Parliament of Western Australia."

References

Living people
Members of the Western Australian Legislative Council
Presidents of the Western Australian Legislative Council
People educated at Newman College, Perth
People from Barry, Vale of Glamorgan
Welsh emigrants to Australia
1951 births
Australian Labor Party members of the Parliament of Western Australia
21st-century Australian politicians